Chutian Golden News or Chutian Jinbao, also known as Chutian Golden Post or Chutian Golden Paper, was a simplified Chinese citizen's life newspaper published in the People's Republic of China. It was a subsidiary of the Hubei Daily. 

The newspaper was inaugurated on November 18, 2001, and ceased to publish on December 1, 2017.

History
Chutian Golden Post was approved by the National Press and Publication General Administration of China in October 2001,  and was officially launched on November 18 of the same year. 

On February 21, 2012, it was revamped to focus on the three major areas of "finance", "emotion" and "people's livelihood".

The newspaper was defunct on December 1, 2017, with related operations merged into Chutian Metropolis Daily (楚天都市报).

References

Publications established in 2001
Publications disestablished in 2017
Defunct newspapers published in China
Chinese-language newspapers (Simplified Chinese)